Abba Sakkara was an insurrectionary leader who lived in the first century in Judea.

Biography
According to Talmudic accounts, he took a very prominent part in the uprising against Rome in 70, being then at the head of the Zealots at Jerusalem. He was the nephew of Johanan ben Zakkai, at that time leader of the Peace party. After the Zealots had destroyed all storehouses, thus causing a famine in the besieged city, Johanan ben Zakkai invited Abba to an interview and asked him: "Why do you act in such a manner? Will you kill us by famine?" Abba replied: "What shall I do? If I tell them anything of the kind, they will slay me." Thereupon Johanan said to him: "Try and invent for me some possibility of escape so that I may be able to save something out of the general wreck." Abba complied with the request; and the Talmud gives a full account of the device by which he enabled his uncle to flee to the Romans.

The historical character of this account is not beyond doubt, and it is especially surprising that Josephus knows nothing of Abba as leader of the Zealots. The fact that Josephus does not mention him, can not, however, be accepted as a sufficient proof against the Talmudic account, for he ignores also Johanan ben Zakkai, one of the most important and influential men at the time of the destruction of the Second Temple. Purely personal motives may have actuated the vainglorious historian to ignore both uncle and nephew. There exists, however, a Midrash which tends to show that there is at least a grain of truth in his account. In Ecclesiastes Rabbah 7:11 it is related: "There was at Jerusalem a certain Ben Baṭiaḥ, a nephew of Johanan ben Zakkai, who was in charge of the storehouses, which he destroyed by fire".

This account is quite independent of that in the Talmud, since they differ not only with regard to the names, but also materially: for, whereas the Talmudic account states that Johanan escaped from Jerusalem by the aid of his nephew, it is related in the Midrash that he barely escaped death at the hands of his nephew. It might, therefore, be assumed that there existed a third and older source from which both the Talmudic and midrashic accounts were derived, and also that the traditions thus handed down underwent some change in the course of transmission.

References

Talmud rabbis of the Land of Israel
Judean people
1st-century rabbis
Rabbis of the Land of Israel